Aksel Malling Mikkelsen (born 15 June 1948) is a Danish equestrian. He competed in two events at the 1972 Summer Olympics.

References

1948 births
Living people
Danish male equestrians
Danish dressage riders
Olympic equestrians of Denmark
Equestrians at the 1972 Summer Olympics
Sportspeople from Copenhagen